Bradl is a surname. Notable people with the surname include:
 Stefan Bradl (born 1989), German Grand Prix motorcycle racer, 2011 Moto2 World Champion
 Helmut Bradl (born 1961), German former Grand Prix motorcycle road racer 
 Josef Bradl (1918 – 1982), Austrian ski jumper 
 Kazimierz Leski (1912 —2000), nom de guerre Bradl, Polish engineer